The men's keirin competition at the 2010 Asian Games was held from 16 to 17 November at the Guangzhou Velodrome.

Schedule
All times are China Standard Time (UTC+08:00)

Results
Legend
DNF — Did not finish
DNS — Did not start
DSQ — Disqualified
REL — Relegated

Round 1

Heat 1

Heat 2

Heat 3

Repechages 1

Heat 1

Heat 2

Heat 3

Round 2

Heat 1

Heat 2

Finals

Final B

Final A

Final standing

References

External links 
Results

Track Men keirin